"South California Purples" (originally titled “Southern California Purples”) is a song written and sung by Robert Lamm for the rock band Chicago and recorded for their debut album Chicago Transit Authority (1969).

The song quotes the opening line from The Beatles' "I Am the Walrus:"
"I am he as you are he as you are me and we are all together."

A live version appears on 1971's Chicago at Carnegie Hall, lasting over fifteen minutes and on Live VI Decades Live (This Is What We Do), recorded at The Isle Of Wight Festival.

Personnel
 Robert Lamm - lead vocals, keyboards
 Terry Kath - guitar, backing vocals
 Peter Cetera - bass, backing vocals
 Danny Seraphine - drums, percussion
 Jimmy Pankow - trombone
 Lee Loughnane - trumpet
 Walt Parazaider - tenor saxophone

References

1969 songs
Chicago (band) songs
Songs written by Robert Lamm
Song recordings produced by James William Guercio
Songs about California